Modern Records was a record label founded in 1980 by Stevie Nicks, Danny Goldberg, and Paul Fishkin. Its logo clearly stated the founding year to avoid confusion with the earlier Modern Records. The label had a distribution deal with Atlantic Records in the United States (also had international distribution with WEA and EMI) and Nicks was the biggest artist on the label, with other artists such as Joey Wilson, Jah Malla, Sandy Stewart, Poe, and Natalie Cole also having records released on the label. Modern Records folded in 1999.

Notable signed artists
Stevie Nicks
Rick Vito
Sandy Stewart
Joey Wilson
Jah Malla
Poe
Natalie Cole

References

External links 
Modern Records album discography from BSN Pubs.

1980 establishments in California
American record labels
Atlantic Records
Companies based in Los Angeles
Companies established in 1980
Entertainment companies based in California
Record labels established in 1980
Record labels disestablished in 1999
Stevie Nicks
Vanity record labels